Harvest Caye is a private island owned by Norwegian Cruise Line, located in southern Belize. The caye features wildlife exhibitions including a blue morpho butterfly house.

On May 23, 2017, personnel from Harvest Caye, accompanied by Edgar Correa of the Belize Forestry Department, removed a juvenile Scarlet Macaw from Belize Bird Rescue to add to Harvest Caye's wildlife exhibits. Belize Bird Rescue, a non-profit organization dedicated to rehabilitating and releasing rescued wildlife, strongly objected to this action, arguing that the bird was healthy and a good release candidate and should not be kept permanently in captivity. The confiscation was also condemned by the Belize Audubon Society and has become a significant controversy for the resort.

See also
 Little Stirrup Cay - a private island used by Royal Caribbean Cruises
 Castaway Cay - a private island used by Disney Cruise Line
 Great Stirrup Cay - another private island by Norwegian Cruise Line

References

External links
 Official site
 Review on Gutter Curator

Tourist attractions in Belize
Norwegian Cruise Line
Private islands of Belize
Islands of Belize
Populated places in Belize